Anga Kiri is a small village in Nakodar.  Nakodar is a tehsil in the city Jalandhar of Indian state of Punjab.

About 
Angi Kiri lies on the Mehatpur road. It is almost 1 km from Mehatpur bus stand. The nearest main road to Angi Kiri is Nakodar-Mehatpur road. The nearest Railway station to this village is Nakodar Railway station.

STD code 
Angi Kiri's STD code is 01821.

References

An Indian website showing Angi Kiri's Details

Villages in Jalandhar district
Villages in Nakodar tehsil